John Malach Shaw (November 14, 1931 – December 24, 1999) was a United States district judge of the United States District Court for the Western District of Louisiana.

Education and career

Born in Beaumont, Texas, Shaw received a Bachelor of Science degree from Washington and Lee University in 1953 and a Juris Doctor from the Paul M. Hebert Law Center at Louisiana State University in 1956. He was in the United States Army from 1956 to 1958, and then in the United States Army Reserve until 1964, achieving the rank of captain. He was in private practice in Opelousas, Louisiana from 1958 to 1979.

Federal judicial service

On June 5, 1979, Shaw was nominated by President Jimmy Carter to a new seat on the United States District Court for the Western District of Louisiana created by 92 Stat. 1629. He was confirmed by the United States Senate on September 25, 1979, and received his commission on September 26, 1979. He served as Chief Judge from 1991 to 1996, assuming senior status on November 15, 1996. He served in that capacity until his death on December 24, 1999, in Lafayette, Louisiana.

References

Sources
 

1931 births
1999 deaths
People from Beaumont, Texas
People from Opelousas, Louisiana
Military personnel from Texas
Washington and Lee University alumni
Louisiana State University Law Center alumni
Judges of the United States District Court for the Western District of Louisiana
United States district court judges appointed by Jimmy Carter
20th-century American judges
United States Army officers
20th-century American lawyers